Yona Fischer (20 November 1932 – 3 March 2022) was an Israeli art curator.

Biography
Fischer began his career in the 1960s at the Bezalel Museum. In 1965 at the opening of the Israel Museum he was appointed curator of Israeli and modern art, and later at the Ashdod Museum of Art. He introduced the works of prominent Israeli artists like Raffi Lavie and Moshe Kupferman. Fisher and Kupferman met in 1967. Kupferman's first major solo exhibition was curated by Fischer in 1969. Fischer was a recipient of the Israel Prize for design. Fischer died on 3 March 2022, at the age of 89.

References

1932 births
2022 deaths
Israeli curators
Israel Prize in design recipients
Israeli art critics
People from Tel Aviv